Eastern Orthodox Christianity in Norway is a small minority religion in Norway with 11,205 official members in 2012, up from 2,315 in 2000. although the church is rapidly growing, and predicted to surpass other Christian denominations.

History of the Eastern Orthodox Church in Norway 

Since the Viking Age, Scandinavians came into contact with both the Byzantine Empire and their neighbors, the Russians. Several of the Viking chiefs and kings not only resided in Novgorod but also helped to make Kiev an important medieval center. At some point during the late ninth or early tenth century Kiev fell under the rule of Varangians and became the nucleus of the Rus' polity. In a number of contemporary sources it is in fact the Scandinavians whom were known as "Rus"; another term was used for the numerous Slavic tribes.

In the 16th century a Russian missionary, St. Tryphon of Pechenga, evangelized some of the Sami population of Norway and built an Orthodox chapel along the Neiden River. Following the socialist revolution in 1917, a number of Orthodox refugees from Russia fled to Scandinavia, first to Sweden and eventually to Norway. The Eastern Orthodox Church in Russia organized pastoral work among them through the church in Stockholm, founded in 1617. In 1931, St. Nikolai church was established in Oslo. This congregation of Russian tradition is under the jurisdiction of the Patriarchate of Constantinople and was the first modern Orthodox congregation established in Norway. The 1960s and 1970s saw in influx of Orthodox from Greece in addition to the first known conversions of Norwegians in modern times. Through immigration from Russia, the former Yugoslavia, and other Eastern European countries, the number of Orthodox Christians in Norway has increased significantly since 1990. The past decade has also seen the more permanent establishment of Orthodox communities of Serbian, Bulgarian and Romanian tradition, the priests of these communities under their corresponding jurisdictions.

The Ecumenical Patriarchate 

The Patriarchal Exarchate for Orthodox Parishes of Russian Tradition in Western Europe has a one priests  in Norway, in the Oslo  There are several affiliate or mission communities in Bergen and Stavanger

The Greek Community
The primarily Greek congregation of the Annunciation of the Theotokos was founded in 1965 with main purpose of serving the Greek-speaking Orthodox community in Norway. This church is under the jurisdiction of Metropolitan Cleopas (Strongylis) of Sweden and all of Scandinavia, and is based in Stockholm. The congregation celebrates the Divine Liturgy approximately once a month through the services of f. Alexandros.

The Serbian Patriarchate 

The first modern Orthodox congregation, St. Nikolai Orthodox Church, was formerly under the jurisdiction of the Patriarchal Exarchate for Orthodox Parishes of Russian Tradition in Western Europe but is now part of the Serbian Orthodox Church. While it adheres to the Russian or Slavic tradition, the Norwegian language is always used along with Slavonic and at times used exclusively. This reflects the missionary tradition of the Orthodox Church, as in for example the work of Sts. Cyril and Methodius, renowned for helping to create a local alphabet (Cyrillic) in order to translate both the Holy Bible as well as the various liturgical books of the Eastern Orthodox Church. as well  St. George's chapel at Neiden. In addition there is a small skete dedicated to St. Tryphon of Pechenga, home to two monks.

The Moscow Patriarchate 

The main parish of the Moscow Patriarchate, St. Olga's, was founded in Oslo in 1996. Today, there are also independent churches under the Moscow Patriarchate in Stavanger, Bergen, Trondheim and Kirkenes. In addition, the Moscow Patriarchate sponsors work in Tromsø and in the Russian settlement of Barentsburg on Svalbard. Russian communities in northern Norway have often been attended to by Russian clergymen of the Moscow Patriarchate. there is two congregations under  One in Oslo: «St.Hallvard orthodox  Parish» : f.Olav Lerseth and «The Annunciation of the Holy Virgin Mary Orthodox Parish» in Bergen: f.Theodor Svane, both under  Patriarchal Exarchate for Orthodox Parishes of Russian Tradition in Western Europe

Number of adherents

See also 
 Christianity in Norway

References

External links 
 The Moscow Patriarchate Churches in Norway
 The Annunciation of the Theotokos (Greek parish - Oslo)
 St. Nikolai Orthodox Church (Oslo)